Peerless Records was a record label based in Mexico.

Peerless was founded in 1921 in Mexico City by E. Baptista. Early pressings of their gramophone record were made under contract by Gennett Records. By 1933, Peerless was pressing its own records in Mexico.  The Peerless label mostly released popular Mexican music; some popular dance bands and tunes from the United States of America also appeared on Peerless in the 1920s.

In addition to Mexico, Peerless Records were sold in other parts of Latin America and in some communities in the Southwest United States.  The labels sometimes have text in both English and Spanish.

Peerless was considered a "major label" in Mexico during the 1940s and 1950s.

Peerless issued some long-playing vinyl records starting in 1951. During the years, Peerless has been the record label for many well-known artists, such as Pedro Infante and Los Apson. Peerless remained an independent label until 2001, when it merged with its subsidiary MCM (Metro Casa Musical), becoming Peerless-MCM S.A. de C.V., which was later bought by Warner Music Mexico

See also
 Esmeralda (singer)
 List of record labels

References

External Links
 

Mexican record labels
Record labels established in 1921
Defunct record labels